The Bones of What You Believe is the debut studio album by Scottish synth-pop band Chvrches, released on 20 September 2013 by Virgin Records and Goodbye Records. Recorded between 2011 and 2013 in Glasgow, the album was written, composed, and produced by the band as a collaborative effort. It was made available as both a 12-track standard edition and an 18-track special version, the latter including two extra songs, two remixes and two live videos. The album was debuted with a launch party broadcast live on music streaming platform Boiler Room.

The album's title derives from a lyric in the song "Strong Hand"; according to frontwoman Lauren Mayberry, it refers to the raw "creativity and effort" that served as the figurative and literal skeleton for the album. Musically, The Bones of What You Believe is primarily a synth-pop and indie pop album that incorporates 1980s influences.

The Bones of What You Believe received critical acclaim, with many complimenting Mayberry's songwriting and vocal performance, and Iain Cook and Martin Doherty's use of synthesisers and vocal loops. The album debuted at number nine on the UK Albums Chart, selling 12,415 copies in its first week. It also reached the top 15 in Australia, Ireland and the United States, and the top 20 in Austria and Canada. The album has sold 152,514 copies in the UK and 184,000 copies in the US. Pitchfork ranked The Bones of What You Believe at number 180 on its list of "The 200 Best Albums of the 2010s".

The album spawned seven singles: "The Mother We Share", "Recover", "Gun", "Lies", "We Sink", "Under the Tide" and "Tether", with the lead single becoming a moderate commercial success, charting in the top 10 in Belgium and Japan, as well as the top 40 in the United Kingdom. It also peaked at number 12 on the Alternative Songs chart in the United States.

Critical reception

The Bones of What You Believe received generally positive reviews from music critics. At Metacritic, which assigns a normalised rating out of 100 to reviews from mainstream publications, the album received an average score of 80, based on 39 reviews. Kyle Ryan of The A.V. Club complimented Mayberry's songwriting and wrote that Chvrches "have crafted one of the year's best albums, which means that buzz won't be dying down any time soon." Joe Rivers of Clash lauded the album as "an exceptionally strong debut where every track is a potential single", noting that "[n]ot only do CHVRCHES revive the [synthpop] sound, they push it forward, with wave upon wave of shimmering synths, more hooks than an angling shop and a songwriting acumen that belies the group's relative infancy." Reed Fischer of Alternative Press stated, "The heartbreaking and indignation in Lauren Mayberry's laser-precise voice makes her an imperfect protagonist in the song length dramas found throughout her band's debut", adding that "even more devastation (the building-crushing kind this time) stems from Ian Cook and Martin Doherty's sophisticated and catchy layers of synthesizers and vocal hoops." Larry Fitzmaurice of Pitchfork described the album as "a seamless fusion of emotive theatrics, hook-loaded songwriting, and some of the more forward-thinking sonics in electronic music right now", and found that "the hooks on The Bones of What You Believe are indelible regardless of instrumentation, and the sound is immaculate."

At Spin, Puja Patel opined that the album is "at its best on its revenge tunes", concluding, "In a mainstream landscape that's still reveling in the EDM-fueled fuck-yous of Icona Pop and Charli XCX's 'I Love It,' CHVRCHES' poppy electronic textures and bleakly lyrical brashness raises the bar." Rolling Stones Jon Dolan expressed, "Even when Chvrches are just competently mopey, their neon-Eighties visions are far from retro pose-striking." Barry Nicolson of NME praised the album's "great songwriting" and felt that "while not every track has the immediacy of 'Lies' or 'Recover', there's not a weak one among them." Heather Phares of AllMusic wrote, "Even on the darkest moments, such as 'Lies' or 'Science/Visions,' there's a disarming emotional directness to The Bones of What You Believe that makes it a unique, fully realized take on a style that seemed close to being played out." Ally Carnwath of The Observer commented that Chvrches are "more robust and melodic than arty peers such as Grimes and Purity Ring—choruses are foregrounded, synthy jabs pummel Lauren Mayberry's vocals, beats drop from satisfying heights—but Mayberry's lyrics also carry a subversive twist of angst and obsession." In a mixed review, Slant Magazines Kevin Liedel remarked, "While the album has its fair share of sweet spots, the handful of capable melodies never quite balances out its bizarre impulses or the utter lack of thematic unity."

Accolades

Track listing

Personnel
Credits adapted from the liner notes of The Bones of What You Believe.

 Chvrches – production ; mixing at Wall 2 Wall Recording, Chicago 
 Jonny Scott – drums 
 Rich Costey – mixing at Eldorado Recording Studios, Burbank, California 
 Chris Kasych – Pro Tools 
 Martin Cooke – Pro Tools 
 Bo Hill – mix assistance 
 Eric Isip – mix assistance 
 Bob Ludwig – mastering at Gateway Mastering, Portland, Maine
 Amy Burrows – design

Charts

Weekly charts

Year-end charts

Certifications and sales

|}

Release history

References

2013 debut albums
Chvrches albums
Vertigo Records albums
Virgin Records albums